Hume Station may refer to:

Hume Station in Fresno County, California, United States
Hume MRT station, a future station in Singapore